Cancer/testis antigen 55 is a protein that in humans is encoded by the CT55 gene.

References

Further reading